Miss E may refer to:

A character in The Letter People, American literary program
Miss E... So Addictive, 2001 hip-hop album by Missy Elliott